The First Presbyterian Church is located at 57 E. Park Place in the town of Morristown in Morris County, New Jersey. The congregation started worship here in 1733. It received a royal charter from George II of Great Britain in 1756. The current church building was erected in 1894. The stone building features Romanesque Revival architecture and works by Louis Comfort Tiffany. The church was added to the National Register of Historic Places, listed as a contributing property of the Morristown District, on October 30, 1973.

History

Second Presbyterian Church
In 1840, the congregation decided to split in two, and formed the Second Presbyterian Church. In 1863, the name was changed to the South Street Presbyterian Church at Morristown. After a fire destroyed the original church building, a new stone church was built in 1878, designed by architect J. Cleaveland Cady in Romanesque Revival style. The building is also listed as a contributing property of the Morristown District. In 1925, the two congregations merged to form the Presbyterian Church in Morristown.

See also
 First Presbyterian Churchyard
 List of Presbyterian churches in New Jersey
 National Register of Historic Places listings in Morris County, New Jersey

References

External links 
 
 
 

Morristown, New Jersey
Churches in Morris County, New Jersey
Presbyterian churches in New Jersey
Churches completed in 1894
19th-century Presbyterian church buildings in the United States
Romanesque Revival church buildings in New Jersey
Churches on the National Register of Historic Places in New Jersey
Historic district contributing properties in New Jersey
Historic district contributing properties in Morris County, New Jersey